Judge Jerubial Gideon Dorman House, also known as the Dorman House, is a historic home located at Clinton, Henry County, Missouri.  It was built in 1852, and is two-story, central passage plan, brick I-house with Greek Revival and Gothic Revival style design elements. It has a side gable roof and a full-width front porch.

It was listed on the National Register of Historic Places in 1983.

References

Houses on the National Register of Historic Places in Missouri
Greek Revival houses in Missouri
Gothic Revival architecture in Missouri
Houses completed in 1852
Buildings and structures in Henry County, Missouri
National Register of Historic Places in Henry County, Missouri